Monterey Pass is a  mountain pass located in Franklin County, southern Pennsylvania.

Geography
The saddle area lies near Happel's Meadow,  between Monterey Peak (1,663 ft) and Clermont Crag (1627 ft), in the South Mountain Range of the northern Blue Ridge Mountains System. 

Monterey Pass is located near Blue Ridge Summit and the historical Mason–Dixon line.

History

Gettysburg Campaign

Monterey Pass was the site of the July 1863 Fight at Monterey Pass during the Retreat from Gettysburg in the American Civil War.

The first military engagement at Monterey Pass occurred on June 22, 1863. Captain Robert B. Moorman, commanding Company D of the 14th Virginia Cavalry was dispatched eastward from the area between Greencastle, Pennsylvania, and Hagerstown, Maryland, to obtain horses reportedly available from local Southern sympathizers. After the company passed through Leitersburg, Maryland, and on to Caledonia Furnace; at Monterey the company encountered Bell's Adams County Cavalry and the First Troop, Philadelphia City Cavalry, both temporarily based in Gettysburg. After a very brief skirmish, the Confederate troops withdrew toward Hagerstown, joining General Richard S. Ewell, who was advancing with a larger force.

Previous combat in the area included a June 21 engagement at Fairfield, and subsequent engagements prior to the Battle of Gettysburg included the first combat of Adams County, Pennsylvania, during the Civil War. (Pennsylvania militia at Fountain Dale on June 28) and at Emmitsburg, Maryland, on June 24.

In addition to the July 4–5 Fight at Monterey Pass, July 4 combat in the area included the Skirmish at Fairfield Gap, Pennsylvania, and skirmishes near Emmitsburg MD (9.4 miles east), Zora, Pennsylvania, and Waynesboro, Pennsylvania (6.5 miles west). As late as July 8, Union forces such as Company D, 10th New York Cavalry, were still in the area.

East Cemetery Hill 
Tablet 6 of 9

See also
 
 Monterey Country Club

References

External links
 Emmitsburg.net: Map of Monterey Pass area military engagements

Mountain passes of Pennsylvania
Landforms of Franklin County, Pennsylvania
South Mountain Range (Maryland−Pennsylvania)